|}

The Grimthorpe Handicap Chase is a National Hunt handicap steeplechase in England which is open to horses aged five years or older. 
It is run at Doncaster over a distance of about 3 miles and 2 furlongs (3 miles, 2 furlongs and 1 yard or ) and during the race there are 19 fences to be jumped. The race is scheduled to take place each year in late February or early March.

Prior to the early 1980s the Grimthorpe Chase was run over two miles and 150 yards. The distance was then nearly doubled to a stamina testing four miles and 100 yards.

The distance was changed again to the current trip in the 1990s, when it was run as the Velka Pardubicka Grimthorpe Chase, a reference to Velká pardubická, a famous race run in the Czech Republic over varied obstacles. The race is now considered to be a trial for the Grand National.

The race is named in honour of the Grimthorpe family who have been involved in racing for many years. Ralph Beckett, 3rd Baron Grimthorpe owned Fragrant Mac (winner 1952 Scottish Grand National) and Fortina (winner 1947 Cheltenham Gold Cup). Christopher Beckett, the fourth Baron, was a member of the Jockey Club and director of Thirsk Racecourse, and the current Baron Grimthorpe, Teddy Beckett, is chairman of York Racecourse and racing manager to Khalid Abdullah.

Winners since 1985

See also
Horse racing in Great Britain
List of British National Hunt races

References

Racing Post:

National Hunt races in Great Britain
National Hunt chases
Doncaster Racecourse